The Catholic Times was a weekly newspaper for Roman Catholics in Great Britain and Ireland. Founded in 1860, it was published in Manchester, United Kingdom, by the Universe Media Group as a companion paper to The Universe. 
It was merged with The Universe on 1 May 2020.

References

External links
Official website

1860 establishments in the United Kingdom
Publications established in 1860
Catholic newspapers